Jen Hofer (born 1971) is an American poet, translator, and interpreter.

Awards
Hofer won the 2012 PEN Award for Poetry in Translation, for the poem Negro Marfil/Ivory Black.  The PEN Award judges refer to Hofer's translation of Negro Marfil/Ivory Black as a work that "articulates writing as a gesture hovering between binaries, bodies, languages, modes of perception, cultures...[and is] reflexively about translation.

Hofer also won the Harold Morton Landon Translation Award in 2012 for the translation of Myriam Moscona's book Negro Marfil/Ivory Black.

Life
Jen Hofer was born in San Francisco, and lives in Los Angeles.

Professional activities
Hofer is an American poet and translator, and is currently an adjunct professor of MFA writing at Otis College of Art and Design. Prior to that, Hofer was as an Adjunct Professor at California Institute of the Arts.

Hofer was the co-founder (with John D. Pluecker) of Antena, a "language justice and language experimentation collaborative".

Works
Poetry
As far as, A+Bend Press, 1999
Slide rule, Subpress, 2002, 
Lawless, Seeing Eye Books, 2003
Laws, Dusie Kollektiv, 2007
Going Going, Dusie Kollektiv, 2007
13 things I would photograph for you if I could, Self-published, 2009
One, Palm Press, 2009, 
Trouble : August 2009, 3:15 a.m., Dusie Kollektiv, 2010
Lead & Tether, California Institute of the Arts, 2011
The Missing Link, Insert Blanc Press, 2014

Translations
Sin puertas visibles: An Anthology of Contemporary Poetry by Mexican Women, University of Pittsburgh Press, 2003, 
Laura Solórzano, Lip Wolf, Action Books, 2007, 
Dolores Dorantes, sexoPUROsexoVELOZ and Septiembre, Books 2 and 3 of Dolores Dorantes, Counterpath Press and Kenning Editions, 2008, 
Myriam Moscona, Ivory Black, Les Figues Press, 2011, 

Group projects and Collaborations
Bernadette Mayer, Lee Ann Brown, Jen Hofer, Danika Dinsmore, The 3:15 Experiment, Owl Press, 2001 
Patrick F. Durgin, Jen Hofer, The Route, Atelos, 2008,

References

External links

1971 births
Living people
Writers from San Francisco
Poets from California
California Institute of the Arts faculty
American women poets
20th-century American poets
20th-century American women writers
21st-century American poets
21st-century American translators
21st-century American women writers
Spanish–English translators
20th-century American translators
Otis College of Art and Design faculty
American women academics